Mark Posa (born 22 June 1966) is a New Zealand former cricketer. He played three first-class and eight List A matches for Auckland between 1994 and 1996.

See also
 List of Auckland representative cricketers

References

External links
 

1966 births
Living people
New Zealand cricketers
Auckland cricketers
Cricketers from Auckland